Odette Myrtil (born Odette Laure Clotilde Quignarde; June 28, 1898 – November 18, 1978) was a French-born American actress, singer, and violinist. She began her career as a violinist on the vaudeville stage in Paris at 14. She expanded into acting and singing and had her first major success at 18 on the London stage in the 1916 musical revue The Bing Boys Are Here. She was a staple in Broadway productions from 1924 to 1932, after which she returned only periodically to Broadway through 1960. She also appeared on the stages of Chicago, London, Los Angeles, and Paris several times during her career.

From 1923 to 1972, Myrtil appeared as an actress in a total of 28 feature films, most of which were made from the mid-1930s through the mid-1950s. Not a leading lady on camera, she specialized in character roles and was often used for her gifts as a singer. She made only one television appearance during her career: in the Studio One in Hollywood 1953 episode "The Paris Feeling". She worked as a costume designer for nine motion pictures from 1944 to 1950.

Life and career
Odette Myrtil was born Odette Laure Clotilde Quignarde, although some sources cite Belza as her surname at birth, in Paris, the daughter of two stage actors. She studied the violin at a boarding school in Brussels and began performing the violin professionally at the age of 13.

In 1915, aged 16, she came to the United States to join the Ziegfeld Follies on Broadway as one of the Ziegfeld Girls.

The following year she came to London, where she was a major success in the West End show The Bing Boys Are Here. She spent the next several years appearing successfully on the London stage and in vaudeville productions in major European cities.

In 1923, she returned to New York City as a vaudeville entertainer at the Palace Theatre, where she had her first major success in America. She became a staple of the theatre scene in New York City into the early 1930s, often appearing in Broadway musicals that featured her singing and violinist abilities. She had a particular triumph as Odette in Jerome Kern's 1931 musical The Cat and the Fiddle, which was written specifically as a vehicle for her. after that, she only made a handful of appearances on Broadway, with her last show being the original production of Harold Arlen and Johnny Mercer's Saratoga in 1960.

She spent several years in the early 1950s portraying Bloody Mary in the original run of Rodgers and Hammerstein's South Pacific, having succeeded Juanita Hall in the role.

After 1935, her career shifted towards film, although she never left her stage roots. She had a fairly prolific career as a film actress, appearing in mainly mid-sized roles in 25 films from 1936 to 1952. Previously, she only appeared as a dancer in the 1923 film Squibs M.P. Her first speaking role was as Renée De Penable in Dodsworth (1936).

Some of her other film credits are Kitty Foyle (1940), Out of the Fog (1941), I Married an Angel (1942), Yankee Doodle Dandy (1942), The Palm Beach Story (1942), Uncertain Glory (1944), Devotion (1946), The Fighting Kentuckian (1949), and as Madame Darville in Alfred Hitchcock's Strangers on a Train (1951). She sang the title song on camera as herself in the 1954 film The Last Time I Saw Paris (1954) and again portrayed herself in her last film appearance in the film Hot Pants Holiday (1972).

Post-acting career
Myrtil resided in New Hope, Pennsylvania during most of her later life. From 1955 to 1958 she managed The Playhouse Inn, located next door to the Bucks County Playhouse. From 1961 to 1976 she operated the New Hope restaurant Chez Odette, which later became Odette's Restaurant, a different restaurant under newer ownership.
 
During her life, Myrtil was married twice: for eight years to vaudeville performer Robert Adams and later to film director and producer Stanley Logan. She died in nearby Doylestown, Pennsylvania in 1978, aged 80.

Filmography

References

External links
 
 
 

1898 births
1978 deaths
American film actresses
American musical theatre actresses
Actresses from Paris
French emigrants to the United States
Musicians from Paris
20th-century American actresses
20th-century American violinists
20th-century French musicians
Women violinists
People from New Hope, Pennsylvania
20th-century American women singers
20th-century American singers
20th-century French women